The Musicians Union of South Africa (MUSA) was a South African trade union. It had a membership of 700 and was affiliated with the Congress of South African Trade Unions. It merged with Performing Arts Workers' Equity (PAWE) to form the Creative Workers Union of South Africa (CWUSA).

External links
 MUSA at the COSATU.

Defunct trade unions in South Africa
Trade unions based in Johannesburg
Musicians' trade unions
Music organisations based in South Africa